Huddersfield Literature Festival (HLF) is an annual literary festival that takes place in March in Huddersfield, West Yorkshire, England.

Introduction
HLF is a blended 10-day digital and venue-based literature festival of 50+ events held online and at accessible spaces in Huddersfield. It includes author talks, performance poetry, workshops, discussion topics, wellbeing projects, family and multi-arts events.

The Festival promotes community cohesion and offers opportunities to enjoy arts and culture to a wide range of people, with free and low-cost activities, innovative commissions inspired by local community partnerships, and proactive engagement with underrepresented creatives, performers and audiences.

Events take place online, outdoors and at a number of venues around Huddersfield, including The University of Huddersfield, Lawrence Batley Theatre, Huddersfield Town Hall, The Media Centre, libraries and local bars/cafes.

The Festival provides Access Guides to key venues and includes several subtitled events every year. Many events are free or low cost.

Festival patrons are Lemn Sissay MBE and Sir Patrick Stewart OBE.

In 2016, 2017 & 2020, the Festival was chosen as a finalist in Welcome to Yorkshire's White Rose Awards and in May 2017 it won a Huddersfield Examiner Community Award (Arts category).

The next Huddersfield Literature Festival is scheduled to run in March 2022.

History
Originally conceived in 2006 the festival is run as a not-for-profit organisation, with funding from the University of Huddersfield and the Arts Council, with business sponsorship from local firms.

From 2009 to 2011 the festival was headed up by creative writing tutor and author Michael Stewart. In 2012 it took a break, but was relaunched in 2013 with a new Festival Director Michelle Hodgson of Key Words. In April 2013, Michelle featured in The Independent on Sundays Happy List for her work with the festival.

Over the years, the festival has welcomed a diverse range of authors, poets and performers (see below).

Notable visiting authors

2006
Abdellatif Akbib (Winner of the British Council Literary Prize 2003 ), Francesca Beard, Martyn Bedford, John Boyne, Donna Daley-Clarke, David Stuart Davies, Gideon Defoe, Jeremy Dyson, Paul Farley, Mark Gatiss, George Green, Sarah Hall, Stephen Hall, Geoff Hattersley, Peter Hobbs, Gaia Holmes, Simon Ings, Helen Ivory, Chris Kerr, Shamshad Khan, Frances Leviston, Mil Millington, Julie Myerson, Patrick Neate, Jacob Polley, Geoff Ryman, Adam Strickson, George Szirtes, Dr Harriet Tarlo, Sophie Wainwright (aka: Sophie Codman), Louise Welsh

2007
Andrew Motion, Joanne Harris, Adam Foulds, Joolz Denby, Simon Trewin, Simon Scarrow, Robert Low, Dorothea Smartt, Gaia Holmes, Shamshad Khan. Lee Hughes, David Wheatley, Rommi Smith, George Green, Michael Stewart, Sol B River.

2008
Ann Cleeves, Duncan Lawrie, Joanne Harris, Doreen Lawrence, Kester Aspden CWO Gold Dagger Winner 2008, Sefi Atta, Janet Fisher, Louise Page, Jim Greenhalf, Nick Toczek and Yunis Alan.

2009
Joanne Harris, Lemn Sissay, Ian McMillan, John Cooper Clarke, Mark E. Smith, Simon Armitage.

2010
Alexei Sayle, A. L. Kennedy, Sara Maitland, Moniza Alvi.

2011
David Peace. Melvin Burgess, David Nobbs, Anne Fine.

2012
Break year, no festival.

2013
Jodi Picoult, Kate Atkinson, Joanne Harris, Jeremy Dyson, Annabel Pitcher, Michael Stewart, Monkey Poet, Andrew Mitchell, Gaia Holmes.

2014
Kate Adie, Annapurna Indian Dance, David Barnett, Paul Burston, Jim Crace, Mari Hannah, Joanne Harris, Gwyneth Hughes, Keith Jarrett, Marina Lewycka, VG Lee, Adam Lowe, Ken MacLeod, Sunny Ormonde, Lemn Sissay and Jah Wobble.

2015
David Barnett, Paul Burston, M. R. Carey, Bettina Carpi, Jamie DeWolf, Rosie Garland, Matt Haig, Joanne Harris, Amanda Huxtable, Christian Jarrett, Helen Lederer, V. G. Lee, Gary Lloyd, Wilf Lunn, Kei Miller, David Nobbs, Diriye Osman, Gerry Potter, Justina Robson, Kadija Sesay, Michael Stewart, Bryan Talbot & Mary M. Talbot.

2016 
Asfa-Wossen Asserate, Michael Billington, James Bran, Paul Burston, Rosie Garland, Christopher Fowler, Prof Joanne Fletcher, Kate Fox, Claire Harman, Joanne Harris, Alan Johnson MP Ben Miller, Michael Stewart, Rupert Thomson, Irvine Welsh, Levison Wood

2017 
Jake Arnott, James Bran, Paul Burston, Kit De Waal, Kate Fox, Joanne Harris, Alan Johnson MP, Murray Lachlan Young, Owen Lowery, Adrian Lukis, Jenni Murray, Henry Normal, Ian Rankin, Lemn Sissay, Attila the Stockbroker, Julie Summers, Michael Stewart

2018 
Diane Allen, Annapurna Indian Dance, Simon Armitage, Paul Burston, Emily Drabble, Joanne Harris, Marty Jopson, Vaseem Khan, Lucy Mangan, David McAlmont, Owen O'Neill, Helen Pankhurst, Annabel Pitcher, Michael Stewart, Sir Patrick Stewart, Jeremy Vine.

2019 
Johnny Ball, Paul Burston, Ann Cleeves, Jon Copley, Kit de Waal, Professor Angela Gallop, Joanne Harris, Darren Henley, Alan Johnson, Kate Fox, Lisa Luxx, Owen O'Neill, Nikesh Shukla, Cath Staincliffe, Michael Stewart.

2020 
Bernardine Evaristo, Helen Mort, Lemn Sissay
(note: events limited due to Covid outbreak)

2021 
Paul Burston, AA Dhand, Dark Horse Theatre, Ching He Huang, Alexander McCall Smith, Val McDermid, Kei Miller, Saima Mir, Johny Pitts, Peter Robinson, Monique Roffey

2022 
Joan Anim-Addo, Annapurna Indian Dancers, RC Bridgestock, Dr John Cooper Clarke, Professor Angela Gallop, Joanne Harris, Erin Kelly, Deidre Osborne, Pete Paphides, Sharena Lee Satti, Kadija Sesay, Lemn Sissay, Greg Stobbs, Rupert Thomson, Toni Tone.

References

External links
 

Literary festivals in England
Festivals in West Yorkshire
Tourist attractions in Huddersfield